Late Night Tales: Jamiroquai is compilation album curated by British funk/acid jazz band Jamiroquai. Released on 10 November 2003, the album is the tenth release in the Late Night Tales series. A special edition of the album was released in September 2005, with the addition of a Buffalo Man embossed slipcase. The album has been re-mastered and re-released in November 2010 and is now available on iTunes. https://music.apple.com/gb/album/late-night-tales-jamiroquai-remastered/1093825540

Track list

References

Jamiroquai
2003 compilation albums
Jamiroquai
Soul compilation albums
Funk compilation albums
Alternative rock compilation albums
Disco compilation albums